Eskasoni 3A is a Mi'kmaq reserve located in Cape Breton County, Nova Scotia.

It is administratively part of the Eskasoni First Nation.

Indian reserves in Nova Scotia
Communities in Cape Breton County
Mi'kmaq in Canada